Tuxenentulus is a genus of proturans in the family Acerentomidae.

Species
 Tuxenentulus boedvarssoni Nosek, 1981
 Tuxenentulus jilinensis Yin, 1984
 Tuxenentulus ohbai Imadaté, 1974
 Tuxenentulus rockyensis Imadaté, 1981
 Tuxenentulus wuluensis Chao & Chen, 1999

References

Protura